Terrance Lynn Schoonover (December 26, 1951November 11, 1984) was an American stock car racing driver. A competitor in the NASCAR Winston Cup Series, he was killed in an accident in a race of 1984 at Atlanta International Raceway.

Career
Schoonover began racing at the age of sixteen in drag racing and later moved to racing on dirt tracks in West Palm Beach, Florida.

After graduating from the Buck Baker Driving School, he served as a driving instructor at the school for a year. He would soon reach an agreement with Restore Auto Care Products to sponsor a limited NASCAR Winston Cup Series campaign in 1984 and a full-time campaign in 1985, driving a car he co-owned with his girlfriend Barbara Pike.

He made his Winston Cup debut at Rockingham Speedway in 1984, driving his own No. 42 Chevrolet home to a 21st-place finish. The next race, at Atlanta International Raceway, on lap 129, Schoonover was involved in an accident where he hit the outside wall, then slid into the infield and struck a dirt embankment head on at a fairly high speed. The safety crew had to cut the roof of his car and roll it back in order to extricate him from the car, and he was eventually airlifted from the speedway to a local hospital where he died of massive head and internal injuries. His death was the first fatality at the Atlanta track.

Motorsports career results

NASCAR
(key) (Bold – Pole position awarded by qualifying time. Italics – Pole position earned by points standings or practice time. * – Most laps led.)

Winston Cup Series

References

External links 

1951 births
1984 deaths
Sportspeople from West Palm Beach, Florida
Racing drivers from Florida
NASCAR drivers
Racing drivers who died while racing
Sports deaths in Georgia (U.S. state)
Filmed deaths in motorsport
Sportspeople from Lima, Ohio
People from Montgomery County, Ohio